Steffen Wesemann (born 11 March 1971) is a Swiss-German former professional road racing cyclist.

He competed in the individual road race at the 1992 Summer Olympics. Wesemann most recently rode for the professional continental team Cycle Collstrop after riding a year with the Team Wiesenhof–Felt squad. He had previously spent the other years of his career at Telekom who later became Team T-Mobile. He rode and completed the Vuelta a España on three occasions in 1995, 1996 and 2003 and finished the Tour de France twice in 1999 and 2002.

In September 2005, Wesemann and his family, longtime residents of Küttigen, Switzerland, obtained Swiss citizenship.  He was a specialist in the one-day Spring Classics—winner of the 2004 Tour of Flanders and 5-time champion of the Peace Race.

Major results 

1989
 3rd  Road race, UCI Road World Championships
1990
 2nd Overall Paris–Bourges
1991
 1st  Overall Tour de Berlin
1992
 1st  Overall Niedersachsen-Rundfahrt
1st Prologue & Stage 9b
 1st  Overall Peace Race
1st Stages 1 & 4
 1st GP Buchholz
 3rd Overall Rheinland-Pfalz Rundfahrt
1993
 1st Stage 5 Setmana Catalana de Ciclisme
 1st Sprints classification, Vuelta a Andalucía
 1st Stage 11 Tour de l'Avenir
1994
 1st Stage  Coca-Cola-Trophy
1995
 2nd E3 Prijs Vlaanderen
 3rd Grand Prix Gippingen
1996
 1st  Overall Peace Race
1st Sprints classification
1st Stages 1, 2, 4a (ITT), 5, 8, 9 & 10
 1st Stage 4 Rheinland-Pfalz Rundfahrt
 4th Veenendaal–Veenendaal
1997
 1st  Overall Peace Race
1st Prologue & Stages 2, 3 & 7
1998
 1st Rund um den Flughafen Köln-Bonn
 1st Stage 4a Vuelta a Castilla y León
 2nd Overall Peace Race
 2nd Overall Sachsen Tour
1st Prologue
1999
 1st  Overall Peace Race
1st Stages 2, 7 (ITT) & 10
 7th Tour de Berne
 9th Gent–Wevelgem
2000
 1st Rund um Köln
 1st Grand Prix Gippingen
 1st Stage 1 (TTT) Tour de Suisse
 2nd Omloop Het Volk
 2nd Road race, German National Road Championships
 3rd Overall Tour Down Under
1st Stage 4
 3rd Overall Peace Race
1st Stages 1 & 4 (ITT)
 3rd GP Buchholz
 9th Paris–Roubaix
 9th Gent–Wevelgem
2001
 2nd E3 Prijs Vlaanderen
 3rd Gent–Wevelgem
 7th Paris–Roubaix
2002
 2nd Paris–Roubaix
 8th E3 Prijs Vlaanderen
 10th Overall Tour Down Under
2003
 1st  Overall Peace Race
1st Stage 3
 1st Rund um den Flughafen Koln/Bonn
 1st Stage 5 Sachsen Tour
 2nd Amstel Gold Race
 2nd E3 Prijs Vlaanderen
 5th GP du canton d'Argovie
 9th Overall Tour Down Under
2004
 1st Tour of Flanders
2005
 6th Züri-Metzgete
 6th E3 Prijs Vlaanderen
2006
 2nd Amstel Gold Race
 6th Paris–Roubaix
 10th Overall Eneco Tour
2007
 3rd Paris–Roubaix
 3rd GP Bucholtz
2008
 7th Rund um den Henninger-Turm

References

External links

1971 births
Living people
People from Wolmirstedt
Swiss male cyclists
German male cyclists
Cyclists at the 1992 Summer Olympics
Olympic cyclists of Germany
Cyclists from Saxony-Anhalt
Naturalised citizens of Switzerland
East German male cyclists
People from Bezirk Magdeburg